Weslemkoon Lake is located in the Township of Addington Highlands, Ontario, Canada, near Denbigh and about  north of Belleville.  The lake is well known for large and small-mouth bass and lake trout fishing, cottaging, seclusion, and wildlife, making it a perfect retreat for people wishing to "get away from it all."

The lake is characterized by a rocky shoreline, with numerous bays and coves that are home to bogs, and swampy areas.  There are abundant islands, many of which are uninhabited or public land and can be used as recreational areas.  Notable are the 5 islands, which are a small group of islands in the center of the main body of the lake, a suspension bridge built between two islands, and Squaw Point, which is a treeless area where it is said Algonquin Native women and children retreated to during times of battle.

When heading north on the lake from the southern end, a viewer would notice a lighthouse that has stood since the 1920s and, up until the installation of a large orange flashing beacon placed on top of a 55-gallon drum and mounted to a rock, served to mark the narrow entrance into the main body of the lake.  The lighthouse cottage has been said to have been visited by Thomas Edison and Henry Ford.

Wildlife include: common loon, great blue heron, black bear, ruby throated hummingbird, pileated woodpecker, bald eagle, beaver, moose, great horned owl, lynx, bobcat, and Mud snake.

See also
List of lakes in Ontario

Lakes of Lennox and Addington County